is a passenger railway station located in the city of Sanuki, Kagawa, Japan.  It is operated by the private transportation company Takamatsu-Kotohira Electric Railroad (Kotoden) and is designated station "S15".

Lines
Kotoden-Shido Station is the eastern terminus of the Kotoden Shido Line and is located 12.5 km from the opposing terminus of the line at Kawaramachi Station].

Layout
The station consists of a single deadheaded island platform, but basically only one track on the south side is used. The north side is shortenedby a connecting corridor from the platform to the night duty facility, so even with a 2-car train, the driver's cab door  protrudes from the platform. The station is staffed.

Adjacent stations

History
Kotoden-Shido Station opened on November 18, 1911 as Shido Station on the Tosan Electric Tramway. At that time, it was 50 meters west of the current location. It was relocated to its current location and renamed  in May 1932. On November 1, 1943 it became a station on the Takamatsu-Kotohira Electric Railway. Operations were suspended on January 26, 1945 from Yakuri Station to this station on the Shido Line, but were reopened on October 9, 1949, at which time the station was renamed to Kotoden Shido Station

Passenger statistics

Surrounding area
Shido-ji (Temple No.86 on the Shikoku Pilgrimage)
Shido Station - Shikoku Railway (JR Shikoku) Kotoku Line
Sanuki City Hall
Kagawa Prefectural Shido High School

See also
 List of railway stations in Japan

References

External links

  

Railway stations in Japan opened in 1911
Railway stations in Kagawa Prefecture
Sanuki, Kagawa